Amrutham is an Indian Telugu-language television sitcom created and produced by Gunnam Gangaraju. It originally aired on Gemini TV for six years from 18 November 2001 to 18 November 2007 in 313 episodes. It is widely regarded as the greatest Telugu comedy TV series of all time. Most of the episodes were written by Gunnam Gangaraju along with Vasu Inturi who also played the character of Sarvam. Amrutham is especially noted for its clean, family-friendly humour and its satirical takes on everyday issues. The topics of satire are diverse  soap operas, popular films, competitive exams, superstitions, game shows, contemporary politics, current affairs etc.

The show centers on four characters: Amrutha Rao and Anjaneyulu (Gundu Hanumantha Rao), childhood friends and owners of the restaurant Amrutha Vilas in Hyderabad who come up with quirky and creative ideas to improve their restaurant business and get rich, but fail with hilarious consequences each time; Sarvam (Vasu Inturi), cook and server at Amrutha Vilas who is a migrant from Tamil Nadu; Appaji (Sivannarayana), the rapacious, exploitative landlord of Amrutha Vilas who subjects his tenants to unreasonable penalties.

Initially, Sivaji Raja played the role of Amrutha Rao. After that, Naresh replaced him in some episodes before Harsha Vardhan took over and played the character in over 200 episodes out of the total 313 episodes.  The title song was composed and sung by Kalyani Malik with lyrics penned by Sirivennela Sitarama Sastry. Director Chandra Sekhar Yeleti, cinematographer K. K. Senthil Kumar, production designer S. Ravinder, and music composer Kalyani Malik who would later become established film technicians, worked in Amrutham in the beginning phase of their career.

Amrutham was originally broadcast every Sunday on prime time 8 PM slot on Gemini TV. At the time of its inception in the early 2000s, Telugu television was mostly centered around melodramatic soap operas. Amrutham is variously described as a "phenomenon", "sensation" for breaking the norms and became one of the most successful Telugu TV shows of all time. The show was cancelled by the choice of the makers when it was at its peak due to a dearth of writers and new ideas. After the end of its original run, Amrutham was re-telecasted multiple times on various TV channels and garnered good ratings each time. Currently, ZEE5 owns the digital rights of the series.

A spin-off film titled Amrutham Chandamamalo was released in 2014. Its sequel, Amrutham Dhvitheeyam began streaming on ZEE5 from March 2020.

Premise 
The show revolves around two friends  Amrutha Rao "Amrutham" and Anjaneyulu "Anji"  who decide to start a restaurant named Amrutha Vilas, after Amrutham gets fired from his job as an assistant manager at Bow Bow Biscuits by his boss Ambhujanabham. Sarvam is the waiter at Amrutha Vilas and is a migrant from Tamil Nadu.

Appaji, the landlord of the plot of Amrutha Vilas and the residences of Amrutham and Anji, is a miser who subjects his tenants to unreasonable penalties. He wears colourful shirts and an ancestral gold belt. Amrutham's wife Sanjeevani is a gullible and ambitious woman. Anji's wife Santha works in the accounts section of a Government corporation and also helps him in his business occasionally. The sitcom focuses on the hilarious consequences they face from the quirky money-making ideas of Anji.

Cast and characters

Main
Ichapurapu Amrutha Rao "Amrutham" played by Sivaji Raja (episodes 1–55), Naresh (episodes 63–105), and Harsha Vardhan (episodes 110–313); proprietor of Amrutha Vilas restaurant which he started with his childhood friend Anjaneyulu. He is inquisitive, sceptical, and wary of Anji's money-making schemes. He used to work in Bow-Bow Biscuits before starting his own restaurant.
 Amudala Anjaneyulu "Anji" played by Gundu Hanumantha Rao; an expert chef, Amrutham's best friend, neighbour, and business-partner. He is a man full of ideas and often comes up with quirky plans to boost their business which fail with hilarious consequences each time.
Sarveswaran "Sarvam" played by Vasu Inturi; all-in-one worker at Amrutha Vilas. He is the server, cook, cleaner, and delivery boy of the restaurant. He is a migrant from Tamil Nadu.
Gongali Appaji played by Sivannarayana Naripeddi; an exploitative landlord who subjects his tenants to unreasonable fines and penalties. He regularly has all his meals at Amrutha Vilas, set up on his property. He has an atrocious dress sense and wears colourful shirts with an ancestral gold belt. He is the show's antagonist.
 Sanjeevani "Sanju" played by Jhansi, Uma Mahanthi, Supraja and Anita Chowdary; Amrutham's wife. She is a gullible and ambitious woman which makes her vulnerable to Anji's over-the-top ideas and prod her husband into adopting them.
Santha played by Ragini; Anji's wife. She works in the accounts section of a Government corporation. She has her feet planted on the ground. She keeps throwing cold water on Anji and Amrutham's money-making schemes.

Recurring
Rubber Balaji played by Raghava; Amrutham's cousin and a filmmaker known for the soap opera 'Veyi Pudakalu' and other TV shows.
Ambhujanabham played by S. S. Kanchi; Amrutha Rao's boss and the manager of Bow-Bow Biscuits who was a main character in the earlier episodes. He frequently scolds Amrutham for his incompetence.
Padmini "Paddu" played by Swathi; Amrutham's sister-in-law and Sanju's sister. She lives in her sister's house while finishing her graduation.
Parandamayya played by Devadas Kanakala; Amrutham's father-in-law. He is the father of Sanju and Paddu.
Jenny in various characters. He has portrayed characters like an astrologer, an MLA, Amrutham's uncle Bhimavaram Bullabbayi, and others.
Srinivasa Reddy in various characters.
Narsing Yadav as Ganesh Chaturthi chanda-taking goon and police officer (episode 80–81).
Rallapalli as a doctor.
Melkote played by Shankar Melkote; a student learning Telugu language.
Rama Rajamouli in various characters. She played a newsreader in one episode, a homemaker in another one.

Production

Conception 
Gunnam Gangaraju, along with his friend Venkat Dega, a doctor in Canterbury, UK, founded the company 'Just Yellow' which started off as an IT services firm and later ventured into TV and film production. Their first project under the 'Just Yellow' banner was Amrutham. Gangaraju was the creator of the show as well as the producer. There were reports that veteran film producers like D. Ramanaidu and K. S. Rama Rao cautioned Gangaraju against producing a TV show as it might not be financially viable. After filming seven episodes, they pitched the show to various TV channels and finally got a slot on Gemini TV.

Cast 
It was originally launched with Sivaji Raja as Amrutha Rao "Amrutham", Gundu Hanumantha Rao as Anjaneyulu "Anji", Sivannarayana as Appaji, Vasu Inturi as Sarvam in the lead roles. Besides Sivaji Raja, Naresh also played the character Amrutha Rao for a few episodes before Harsha Vardhan took over and played the character in over 200 episodes out of the total 313 episodes. Ragini played Santha (Anjaneyulu's wife), while Jhansi, Uma Mahanthi, Anita Chowdary, and Supraja played Sanjeevani aka "Sanju" (Amrutham's wife) at various points.

Sivaji Raja who initially played the lead character Amrutha Rao, had a major falling out with the makers. Gangaraju called Sivaji Raja "a sick and greedy man". He accused Sivaji Raja of throwing tantrums and unprofessionalism. Sivaji Raja complained to the 'Association of Telugu TV Artistes' that he was not properly paid by the producers, after which the association banned other artistes from acting in Amrutham. The serial managed without the characters Amrutha Rao and his wife for four months. The ban was lifted after a period of four months. Later Naresh replaced Sivaji as Amrutha Rao. The makers did not face any problems with Naresh. But as the broadcaster Gemini TV hiked their tariff, the serial had budget cuts and Naresh was replaced by Harsha Vardhan.

Gundu Hanumantha Rao who played 'Anji' had to reportedly leave nearly 30 film offers to continue working on Amrutham. After Hanumantha Rao's death in 2018, noted comedian L. B. Sriram played the role of Anji in the sequel, Amrutham Dhvitheeyam.

Costumer designer and stylist Rama Rajamouli, cousin of the show creator and producer Gunnam Gangaraju, played various small roles in the initial episodes of the show. She played a newsreader in one episode, a homemaker in another one.

Crew 
Chandra Sekhar Yeleti, who is also Gangaraju's cousin, directed the first 10 episodes. The serial had eleven debutant directors the most notable among them being Chandra Sekhar Yeleti. Director Chandra Sekhar Yeleti, cinematographer K. K. Senthil Kumar, production designer S. Ravinder, and music composer Kalyani Malik who would later become established film technicians worked in Amrutham in the beginning phase of their career. Senthil worked as a cinematographer for 13 episodes.

Writing 
Gunnam Gangaraju, the creator and producer of the show, wrote most of the episodes along with Vasu Inturi who also played the role of Sarvam. The show only had a few lead characters  Amrutham, Anji, Sarvam, and Appaji with the rest of the characters having occasional appearances, as the creator Gangaraju could not write a larger number of characters.

Amrutham is especially noted for its clean, family-friendly humour and its satirical takes on everyday issues. The topics of satire are pretty diverse  soap operas, popular films, competitive exams, superstitions, game shows, contemporary politics, current affairs etc.

Gangaraju mentioned that there was a dearth of writers for the show. As he was burnt out as a writer, he advertised for new writers with a remuneration that is five times the industry standard at the time. As the response for new writers was not satisfactory and the original writers were exhausted of ideas, the show had to be cancelled even though it was at its peak in the weekly ratings.

Music 
The title track is composed and sung by Kalyani Malik. The lyrics were penned by Sirivennela Sitarama Sastry. Neeshita Nyayapati of Times of India noted in 2017, "The title song, sung by Kalyani Malik, is still one of the most iconic title songs that Telugu television has ever created."

Episodes 

Sources:

Release

Broadcast 
Amrutham originally aired on Gemini TV every Sunday on prime time 8:00 PM slot for exactly six years. The first episode Go Gruha Pravesam aired on 18 November 2001 while the final episode Tata Bye Bye Veedkolu aired on 18 November 2007. The serial had over 100 hours of content divided into 313 episodes.

Syndication and streaming 
Amrutham was re-telecasted multiple times on various TV channels and garnered good ratings each time. After the end of its original run on Gemini TV, Zee Telugu acquired the telecast rights of the show and broadcast it as a daily serial beginning from 26 November 2007, only a week after the end of its original broadcast on Gemini TV. It ran from Monday to Thursday in the prime time 9:00 PM slot. Later, it was broadcast on Maa TV in the weekend days at 7:00 PM. After that, its rights were again acquired by Gemini TV which telecasted it as a daily serial from Monday to Friday at 10:30 PM. Later, it was broadcast on Maa Gold as a daily serial in the 10:00 PM slot. Then, ETV Plus broadcast it as a daily serial from Monday to Friday at 9:30 PM. As of July 2017, it was being telecast as a daily serial on ETV Plus from Monday to Saturday at 6:00 PM.

All the episodes of Amrutham were uploaded on YouTube by the production house Just Yellow Media. It was highly successful and garnered a total of 250 million views. Later, ZEE5 acquired the digital rights of the series and Amrutham was removed from YouTube by Just Yellow Media.

Reception and impact 

The show was an instant success. It garnered high TRP ratings throughout its run of six years. Gangaraju mentioned that Amrutham was cancelled by choice when it was at its peak as they were exhausted of ideas. It is widely considered to be the greatest Telugu comedy TV series of all time.

After the end of its original run, Idlebrain.com noted, "When soaps were mostly women-oriented, Amrutham came as a breath of fresh air with four male characters in the lead. Amrutha Vilas became a household name in Andhra Pradesh and all the characters Amrutha Rao, Anji, Appaji, and Sarvam became lovable characters and the viewers waited to watch them in every episode."

In 2020, director S. S. Rajamouli wrote about the show, "19 years ago, when tear-jerking daily soaps were ruling the roost, it took guts and conviction of one man to come up with a comedy show breaking all norms. What a success story from its ever unsuccessful heroes Anji and Amrutha Rao. True to its name Amrutham made a mark in the hearts of Telugus across the globe."

Awards and nominations

Future 
Gangaraju has plans to novelize the show with each episode being a short story. He thinks an audiobook would be the most suitable format.

References

External links 
 Amrutham on ZEE5
 
 

Indian television series
Indian television sitcoms
2007 Indian television series endings
Telugu-language television shows
Indian comedy television series
Gemini TV original programming
2001 Indian television series debuts